A Defence Technology Centre carries out military science research on behalf of the UK government. They are consortia with members from industry, universities as well as QinetiQ. They are organised by scientific themes. There are currently four DTCs. One for Human Factors Integration, one on Electromagnetic Remote Sensing, one on Data and Information Fusion and one on Autonomous and Semi Autonomous Vehicles.

External links
Ministry of Defence page on DTCs
Data Information Fusion Defence Technology Centre
Human Factors Integration Defence Technology Centre
Electro Magnetic Remote Sensing Defence Technology Centre
Systems Engineering & Integrated Systems for Defence: Autonomous and Semi Autonomous Vehicles Defence Technology Centre

Military research establishments of the United Kingdom